The Badger State Games are a series of annual Olympic-style multi-sport events for amateur athletes from the state of Wisconsin, held twice per year in Wausau. It is a member of the National Congress of State Games. The summer games have been held annually since they began in 1985, originally in Wisconsin's capital city of Madison, then briefly in the Fox Cities area before being relocated to their current home in Wausau in 2012. The winter games have been held in Wausau since they began in 1989. Some sports are represented at both summer and winter editions of the games.

History 
The Wisconsin Amateur Sports Corporation, a non-profit organization, began organizing the first edition of the Badger State Games in 1984. The plan was closely associated with Madison's bid for the 1987 National Sports Festival, which was ultimately awarded to Raleigh-Durham, North Carolina. The inaugural Badger State Games were held in Madison in 1985, with ceremonies including an Olympic-style torch relay that circled the state over the course of two weeks. Wisconsin became the sixteenth state to hold a statewide multi-sport event, with the National Congress of State Games created in 1988 to serve as their governing body.

In its first few years, the event continually grew, and was met with enthusiasm from the state government and local businesses who contributed to fundraising efforts. It was consistently held in Madison during the last weekend of June. A special snowmobile-based torch relay was held in anticipation of the Winter Games. These games also continued to be held annually, during the first weekend of February. By the end of the 1980s, the event had grown significantly and eight regional festivals were established to extend opportunities to even more athletes.

Otto Breitenbach became the executive director of the Wisconsin Amateur Sports Corporation in 1988, and he was credited with raising the profile and scope of the games during his nine-year tenure. By 1997, when Breitenbach retired, the Badger State Games was "considered by many to be the current standard bearer" among statewide multi-sport events, and the country's largest relative to state population.

At the 2006 summer games, Bill Wambach of Sun Prairie, Wisconsin, a long-time competitor, broke the national high-jump record for the 80- to 84-year-old division with a jump of 1.26 meters.

In 2007, American Family Insurance became the primary sponsor of the games, and both the winter and summer events were officially renamed the American Family Insurance Badger State Games for two years.

After the 2008 summer games, the Wisconsin Sports Development Corporation announced that the event would leave Madison and move to the Fox Cities region for at least three years. The decision was made after the Fox Cities Sports Authority offered a grant of $180,000, which the Greater Madison Visitors and Convention Bureau refused to compete with. The games had been in decline for several years up to that point, and there was no opening ceremony for the games' final year in Madison because of construction at James Madison Memorial High School.

Following the 2010 Winter Games, the Wausau/Central Wisconsin Convention and Visitors Bureau withdrew its large annual contributions to the event, leaving it without a host city. The 2011 Winter Games were ultimately held at venues across the state, although many were able to remain in the Wausau area. That same year, the Wisconsin Sports Development Corporation announced that it would discontinue the Badger State Games, after operating at a loss for two years. The WSDC stated that the Games had served their purpose, and that the current market for amateur athletic events had become overly saturated, lowering participation in recent years. The Wausau/Central Wisconsin Convention and Visitors Bureau agreed to purchase both the winter and summer games, holding both events in the Wausau area. It was announced that the summer games would not move to Wausau until 2015, following the completion of the WSDC's deal with the Fox Cities Sports Authority, but the 2012 summer games were ultimately held in Wausau.

The Wausau CVB changed the format of both events in 2015, spreading the dozens of events across a period of months rather than holding them all in the same weekend. This allowed for more sports to be represented, and more athletes to participate in more events.

Sports

Summer Games 
As of 2018, the summer games take place over four months and include events in 24 sports.

5K run/walk
Adventure racing
Archery
Baseball
BMX racing
Bowling
Cornhole
Flag football

Freestyle kayaking
Golf
Gymnastics
Individual time trial
Lacrosse
Martial arts
Pickleball
Skateboarding

Soccer
Softball
Swimming
Track and field
Trap shooting
Volleyball
Weightlifting
Wrestling

Winter Games 
As of 2018, the winter games take place over three months and include events in 21 sports.

Alpine skiing
Archery
Billiards
Bowling
Cornhole
CrossFit
Curling

Disc golf
eSports
Fat-tire bike racing
Figure skating
Ice hockey
Martial arts
Nordic skiing

Pickleball
Pistol shooting
Ski jumping
Snowmobiling
Snowshoe running
Table tennis
Trap shooting

Editions

Notes

External links

1985 establishments in Wisconsin
Multi-sport events in the United States
Recurring sporting events established in 1985
Sports in Wisconsin